Phi Aquilae, Latinized from φ Aquilae, is the Bayer designation of a binary star system in the equatorial constellation of Aquila. It has an apparent visual magnitude of +5.28 and is visible to the naked eye. It is drifting closer with a radial velocity of –27 km/s. Based on its motion through space, this system is considered a possible member of the nearby Argus association of co-moving stars, although it may be too old.

Phi Aquilae is a single-lined spectroscopic binary with an orbital period of 3.32068 days. The primary component is a subgiant star with a stellar classification of A1 IV. The star is around 280 million years old and is spinning with a projected rotational velocity of 27. It has 2.39 times the mass of the Sun and somewhere in the range of 1.8–2.5 times the Sun's radius. The outer atmosphere has an effective temperature of 9,509 K, giving it the white-hued appearance of an A-type star. It is radiating 34 times the luminosity of the Sun.

The orbiting companion may be the source of the X-ray emission from this system, as stars similar to the primary component do not generally produce detectable levels of X-rays. It has 40% of the mass of the Sun.

References

External links
  Simbad Phi Aquilae
 Image
 HR 7610

A-type subgiants
Spectroscopic binaries

Aquila (constellation)
Aquilae, Phi
BD+11 4055
188728
Aquilae, 61
098103
7610